Nørgaard  is a Danish surname, literally meaning north farm. Note that the double a is equivalent of å in common nouns and is retained from the pre-1948 orthography in proper nouns only. A parallel form is Nørregaard.

Nørgaard or Nørregaard may refer to:
Asta Nørregaard, Norwegian artist
Bjørn Nørgaard, Danish artist
Carsten Norgaard, Danish actor
Chloe Nørgaard, Danish and American model
Christian Nørgaard, Danish footballer
Hjalte Nørregaard, Danish footballer
Kari Norgaard, American sociologist
Lise Nørgaard (1917–2023), Danish journalist
Per Nørgård, Danish composer
Richard B. Norgaard, Retired Prof. of Ecology & Economics at UC Berkeley

Danish-language surnames